Kilfoyle is a surname. Notable people with the surname include:

Jack Kilfoyle (1893–1962), Australian pastoralist 
Peter Kilfoyle (born 1946), British politician